Several ships of the French Navy have borne the name Vengeance:

 , a 24-gun frigate
 , a 12-gun frigate
 , a 24-gun corvette, renamed Vénus in 1795
 , a 48-gun frigate, and lead ship of her class
 , a xebec and former privateer
 , 56-gun first-rate frigate

See also

Sources and references
 

French Navy ship names
Set index articles on ships